Obo or OBO may also refer to:

As an acronym
 Bureau of Overseas Buildings Operations, in the U.S. Department of State
 Open Biomedical Ontologies, creating controlled vocabularies
 Oxford Bibliographies Online, by OUP
 Operated by others, a term used in the oil and gas industry
 Ore-bulk-oil carrier, a merchant vessel
 Or Best Offer, usually used on items description on online auction websites.

As a code
 Tokachi-Obihiro Airport, Obihiro, Hokkaido, Japan, IATA code
 Manobo languages, ISO 639-3 code

People
 Obo Addy (1936–2012), Ghanaian drummer and dancer
 Obo Aba Hisanjani (born 1949), Nigerian poet

Other
 Obo II, the first American Cocker Spaniel
 Obo National Park, São Tomé and Príncipe
 Obo or ovoo (Mongolian: овоо, heap), a Mongolian shrine
 Obo, a town in the Central African Republic